Santo Antão Creole, is the name given to the variant of Cape Verdean Creole spoken mainly in the Santo Antão Island of Cape Verde. It belongs to the Barlavento Creoles branch. It is ranked third of nine in the number of speakers and it is before Fogo and after the neighbouring São Vicente.

Characteristics
Besides the main characteristics of Barlavento Creoles the Santo Antão Creole has also the following ones:
 The progressive aspect of the present is formed by putting tí tâ before the verbs: tí + tâ + V.
 The adverb of negation used with verbs, adverbs and adjectives is n’. Ex.: Mí n’ crê instead of M’ câ crê “I don’t want”.
 The stressed final sound  is pronounced . Ex.: já  instead of djâ  “already”, lá  instead of lâ  “there”, and all the verbs that end by ~â, calcá  instead of calcâ  “to press”, pintchá  instead of pintchâ  “to push”, etc.
Ex.: ént’s  instead of ánt's  “before”, grénd’  instead of gránd  “big”, verdéd’  instead of verdád’  “truth”. Also with pronouns: penhé-m’  instead of panhá-m’  “to catch me”.
 Palatalization of the pre-tonic  sound (oral or nasal) to  when the stressed syllable possesses a palatal vowel. Ex.: essím  instead of assím  “like so”, quebéça  instead of cabéça  “head”. Velarization of the pre-tonic  sound (oral or nasal) to  when the stressed syllable possesses a velar vowel. Ex.: cotchôrr’  instead of catchôrr’  “dog”, otúm  instead of atúm  “tuna”.
 The diphthong  (oral or nasal) is pronounced . Ex.: pé  instead of pái  “father”, mém  instead of mãi  “mother”. The diphthong  (oral or nasal) is pronounced . Ex.: pó  instead of páu  “stick”, nõ  instead of nãu  “no”.
 The sound  (that originates from Portuguese , written “lh”) is represented by the sound : bói’  instead of bódj’  “dance (noun)”, ôi’  instead of ôdj’  “eye”, spêi’  instead of spêdj’  “mirror”. Between vowels that sound  disappears: vé’a  instead of bédja  “old (feminine)”, o’á  instead of odjâ  “to see”, pá’a  instead of pádja  “straw”. When it is immediately after a consonant, it is represented by : m’liôr  instead of m’djôr  “better”, c’liêr  instead of c’djêr  “spoon”.
 The sound  disappears when it is between vowels. Ex.: go’áva  instead of goiába  “guava fruit”, mê’a  instead of mêia  “sock”, papá’a  instead of papáia  “papaw”.
Ex. já  instead of djâ  “already”, jantá  instead of djantâ  “to dine”, Jõ’  instead of Djõ’  “John”.
 Existence of a certain kind of vocabulary (also existing in São Vicente) that does not exist in the other islands. Ex.: dançá instead of badjâ “to dance”, dzê instead of flâ “to say”, falá instead of papiâ “to speak”, guitá instead of djobê “to peek”, ruf’ná instead of fuliâ “to throw”, stód’ instead of stâ “to be”, tchocá instead of furtâ “to steal”, tchúc’ instead of pôrc’ “pig”, etc.

Vocabulary

Grammar

Phonology

Alphabet

External links
 a bilingual bar-pub site in Santo Antão Crioulo and French.
 Os Lusíadas in Santo Antão Creole
 Tipêd’ i Tilôb (Tipedo e Tilobo) - traditional short story in Santo Antão Creol

References

Creole